Nicolas Langmede or Longmede (by 1489 – ?), of Dartmouth and Topsham, Devon and London, was an English politician.

He was a Member (MP) of the Parliament of England for Dartmouth in 1529.

References

15th-century births
1541 deaths
Members of the Parliament of England for Dartmouth
English MPs 1529–1536